Ezra Buzzington is an American character actor in film and television. A figure in underground cinema, Buzzington is also the founder of the Seattle Fringe Festival and co-founder of the New York International Fringe Festival.

Career 
With over 60 film credits (and dozens of television appearances), Buzzington has been referred to as "the Dennis Hopper of underground cinema". He has played characters ranging from "Weird Al the Waiter" in Ghost World to "Goggle" (a mutant) in The Hills Have Eyes and Tudley in the Crime thriller film The Chair. He also appeared in the Academy Award-winning Best Picture The Artist. He has worked with directors David Fincher (twice), Alexandre Aja (twice), Terry Zwigoff (twice), Rob Zombie (twice), David Slade (four times), Steven Spielberg, Christopher Nolan, Paul Thomas Anderson, George Clooney, Clint Eastwood and the Farrelly Brothers (also twice). He was a series regular in the role of Oswald Eisengrim on NBC's Crossbones opposite John Malkovich's Blackbeard, recurred on NBC's Law & Order True Crime as DDA Elliot Alhadeff, recurred on ABC's The Middle as the hard of hearing co-worker of Neil Flynn's character, starred in an episode of CBS's How I Met Your Mother and made several appearances on Justified for FX.

He is the founder of the Seattle Fringe Festival, co-founder of the New York International Fringe Festival with John Clancy and Aaron Beall, and an advisor for the Hollywood Fringe Festival during its first seven years. He is also the creator of Theatrism, a metaphysical approach to theatrical staging.

Personal life
He lives in Los Angeles, California. He was born and raised in Muncie, Indiana.

Filmography

Film

Television

References

External links

American male film actors
American male television actors
Male actors from Indiana
Year of birth missing (living people)
Living people
People from Muncie, Indiana
20th-century American male actors
21st-century American male actors